Pascuala Ilabaca (born 1985, Girona, Spain) is a Chilean singer and songwriter, noted for her voice with accompaniment on accordion and piano. She is also a member of Samadi, which compiles ethnic music of India, Africa, Latin America, Middle East, and Europe. She studied music in India 2008-2009.

Awards
 2010 - Gold Guitarpin award, Olmue Festival
 2010 - Audience Award, best Chilean videoclip for “Lamenta la Canela”
 2015 - At The 14th Annual Independent Music Awards, Pascuala Ilabaca y Fauna won the award in the "Tribute Album" category for "Me Saco El Sombrero".

Discography 
 Pascuala Ilabaca y Fauna El mito de la pérgola (2018)
 Pascuala Ilabaca y Fauna Rey Loj (2015)
 Pascuala Ilabaca y Fauna Me saco el sombrero (2014)
 Pascuala Ilabaca y Fauna Busco paraíso (2012)
 Pascuala Ilabaca y Fauna Diablo Rojo, Diablo Verde (2010)
 Samadi Perfume o Veneno (2010)
 Pascuala Ilabaca Pascuala le canta a Violeta (2008)

References

External links
 Official website

1985 births
Musicians from Valparaíso
21st-century Chilean women singers
Chilean folk singers
Living people
Pontifical Catholic University of Valparaíso alumni
Chilean singer-songwriters
Singers from Valparaíso